An autonomous circuit in analogue electronics is a circuit that produces a time-varying output without having a time-varying input (i.e., it has only DC power as an input).
In digital electronics, an autonomous circuit may have a clock signal input, but no other inputs, and operates autonomously (i.e. independently of other circuits), cycling through a set series of states.
A Moore machine is autonomous if it has no data inputs, the clock signal not counting as a data input.
If a Moore machine has data inputs, they may determine what the next state is, even though they do not affect the outputs of any given state, and this is a non-autonomous circuit.

References

Bibliography 

 
 
 
 
 

Electronic circuits